Ri Je-gang (1930 – 2 June 2010) was a North Korean politician.

Career
Ri studied at Kim Il-sung University. He was elevated to the Central Committee of the Workers' Party of Korea (WPK) in 1973 as head of the Organization and Guidance Department (OGD); Kim Jong-il's takeover of the bureau later that year set the stage for his friendship with Ri. He became a deputy chief of the same bureau as well as Kim's personal secretary in 1982; he was elevated to first deputy chief in 1999. He had a long rivalry with Jang Sung-taek.

Ri reportedly directed many of the purges of senior government officials which took place during Kim Jong-il's reign. Ri reportedly imposed capital punishment on many of those purged, in spite of recommendations from his subordinates for lesser punishments such as reeducation.

Death
Ri died due to injuries sustained in a car crash; there were different theories about the cause, including speculation that it may have been foul play. In particular, Andrei Lankov of Kookmin University called the death suspicious, pointing to the lack of traffic in North Korea, and described the death as "part of a long tradition" of politicians being killed in mysterious traffic incidents. In contrast, North Korea analyst Lee Sang-hyun of the Sejong Institute suspected a more innocent explanation, that Ri may have been driving under the influence of alcohol after returning from a party held by Kim Jong-il, and found himself unable to control his vehicle on poorly lit and poorly maintained roads.

References

1930 births
2010 deaths
Road incident deaths in North Korea
Workers' Party of Korea politicians